Tekija is a village in the municipality of Kladovo in eastern Serbia. According to the 2002 census, the village has a population of 967 people.

Tekija is an important strategic and tourist point on the Danube river. It lies in the Iron Gates gorge, below the Miroč mountain, overlooking the Romanian city of Orşova. Although the settlement is first mentioned in records from the First Serbian uprising, the current buildings originate from 1960s: during the building of the Đerdap I hydroelectric dam, the original village was submerged and resettled to the current location. Along with the houses, the nearby island of Ada Kale, last sanctuary of ethnic Turks from the region, sunk under the river.

Tekija lies at the heart of the Đerdap national park. It is a popular destination for fishermen. Traditional festival "Zlatna bućka", held annually, end of August, attracts numerous fishermen and other tourists.

References

Populated places in Bor District